The Crystal Method is the fifth studio album by American electronic duo the Crystal Method.
The album was released on January 14, 2014, although it was set to be released in 2013, but delayed due to Scott Kirkland's brain surgery in early 2013.
The whole album was set as a free stream on Hype Machine on January 4, 2014. The cover, sleeve and digital booklet was designed by Bob Kadrie with band photography by Chapman Baehler. It is also Ken Jordan's final album with the group before retiring in 2017.

Critical reception

The Crystal Method garnered a mixture of both positive and mixed ratings from music critics. At Alternative Press, Annie Zaleski rated it three-and-a-half stars, commenting that the album "Nods elsewhere to New Order's lurching bass, Daft Punk's robotic funk and crushing synthrock are just the cherry on top." Ian Robinson of CraveOnline rated it a seven-out-of-ten, calling it "a decent album, just not what I was hoping for from the dynamic duo of EDM." At The A.V. Club, Lily Moayeri graded it a B−, feeling that the album "is not a comprehensive listening album, but it's not meant to be." Gregory Heaney of Allmusic rated it three stars, writing that the band "are tied more to their mission than the means of completing it". At Las Vegas Weekly, Mike Prevatt rated it three stars, noting how the band "roars with a familiar vigor and distinction." Edna Gunderson of USA Today rated it two out of four stars, commenting that "many of these tracks [sound] desperate or dated."

Track listing

References

External links
 Facebook

The Crystal Method albums
2014 albums